In 1303, the Byzantine Emperor Andronicus II Palaeologus hired 6,500 Catalan mercenaries under Roger de Flor to campaign against the Turks in the spring and summer of the same year. Their costly service came with success, driving back the Turks in parts of Asia Minor. At Philadelphia, 18,000 Turkish soldiers (possibly those of Aydinids) were left dead, the work of the Catalans.

However, the Byzantines got more than what they bargained for; the mercenaries were difficult to restrain and consequently much of the reconquered territory was laid to waste. When their leader Roger de Flor was assassinated in Gallipoli on 3 April 1305 by Michael IX Palaeologus followed by a massacre of 1,300 Catalans, the mercenaries began a two-year pillage in revenge and crossed over to Thrace and Macedonia under the command of their new leader, Berenguer d'Entença, where further raiding occurred. As a result of this brutality, the Company got excommunicated by Pope Clement V. Eventually the Catalan mercenaries claimed the Duchy of Athens for themselves in 1311 and would remain there until 1379, leaving behind a devastated Byzantium. After this, the Turks found much support amongst those who suffered and reoccupied land that had been lost.

Thus, the Catalans' campaign was a short-term Byzantine victory, but benefited the Turks in the long term.

Strength of forces
Initially the Catalan Company, from Aragon, arrived in Constantinople in 1303 with 39 ships and 6,500 men, which consisted of 1,500 horsemen, 4,000 Almogavars and 1,000 footsoldiers, most of whom were Aragonese, Catalans and Valencians from the Crown of Aragon. These forces were later reinforced by 300 horsemen and 1,000 Almogavars and later, they were joined by 300 horsemen and Berenguer d'Entença. After the murder of Roger de Flor the Byzantines killed so many of the Company that only 3,307 men remained. These numbers were further reduced to 206 horseman and 1,256 after an encounter with Genoese forces, according to Muntaner. Before leaving Gallipoli the company was joined by a Turkish force consisting of 800 horseman and 2,000 footsoldiers.

Ramon Muntaner who was a soldier from Catalonia and chronicler, wrote that during a battle in 1304 the Company fought against nearly 30,000 Turks (10,000 cavalry and 20,000 infantry) of which 18,000 (6,000 cavalry and 12,000 infantry) supposedly lay dead.

See also
 Great Catalan Company
 Ramon Muntaner
 Chronicle of Muntaner
 History of the sword

References

Bibliography
Georg Ostrogorsky, Storia dell'Impero bizantino, Milano, Einaudi, 1968, .
John Julius Norwich, Bisanzio, Milano, Arnoldo Mondadori Editore, 2000, .
Alain Ducellier, Michel Kapla, Bisanzio (IV-XV secolo), Milano, San Paolo, 2005, .
A History of the Crusades: Volume III — The Fourteenth and Fifteenth Centuries, ed. Harry W. Hazard, University of Wisconsin Press: Madison, 1975.
Setton, Kenneth M. Catalan Domination of Athens 1311–1380. Revised edition. Variorum: London, 1975.
Jacques Heers, Chute et mort de Constantinople, 1204-1453, éditions Perrin 
Donald M. Nicol, Les Derniers siècles de Byzance, 1261-1453, éditions Les Belles Lettres 

1300s conflicts
Anatolian beyliks
1300s in the Byzantine Empire
Catalan Company
1300s in the Middle East
1303 in Asia
1307 in Asia
Campaigns of the Byzantine Empire